Massachusetts House of Representatives' 11th Plymouth district in the United States is one of 160 legislative districts included in the lower house of the Massachusetts General Court. It covers parts of Bristol County and Plymouth County. Democrat Rita Mendes of Easton represented the district had represented the district since 2023.

Towns represented
The district includes the following localities:
 part of Brockton
 part of Easton

The current district geographic boundary overlaps with those of the Massachusetts Senate's Norfolk, Bristol and Plymouth district and 2nd Plymouth and Bristol district.

Former locales
The district previously covered:
 East Bridgewater, circa 1872 
 North Bridgewater, circa 1872

Representatives
 Paul Couch, circa 1858 
 Benj W. Harris, circa 1858 
 Thomas Conant, circa 1859 
 Edward Southworth, Jr, circa 1859 
 A. Cranston Thompson, circa 1888 
 Frank A. Manning, circa 1920 
 Geraldine Creedon, 1995–2012
 Claire D. Cronin, 2013-2022
 Rita Mendes, 2023-present

See also
 List of Massachusetts House of Representatives elections
 Other Plymouth County districts of the Massachusetts House of Representatives: 1st, 2nd, 3rd, 4th, 5th, 6th, 7th, 8th, 9th, 10th, 12th
 List of Massachusetts General Courts
 List of former districts of the Massachusetts House of Representatives

Images
Portraits of legislators

References

External links
 Ballotpedia
  (State House district information based on U.S. Census Bureau's American Community Survey).

House
Government of Plymouth County, Massachusetts
Government of Bristol County, Massachusetts